Joseph Benson Ochaya (born 14 December 1993) is a Ugandan professional footballer who plays for Egyptian club Al Mokawloon Al Arab and the Uganda national team as a left back.

Ochaya has played club football for Kampala City Council/Kampala Capital City Authority, Navibank Sài Gòn, Asante Kotoko, and Lusaka Dynamos, TP Mazembe and Al Mokawloon Al Arab.

Club career
Born in Kampala, Ochaya began his senior career at Kampala City Council.

In November 2012, he moved from Kampala City Council to Ghanaian club Asante Kotoko for a fee reported to be $30,000. He went on trial with German club SpVgg Greuther Fürth in August 2013. He was the Uganda Premier League 'Most Valuable Player' for the 2015–16 season, while playing for Kampala Capital City Authority. A move to South African club Bidvest Wits in August 2016 fell through.

In March 2017, Ochaya completed his transfer to Zambian club Lusaka Dynamos. In October 2018, he signed with Congolese club TP Mazembe. In September 2022, he joined Egyptian club Al Mokawloon Al Arab.

International career
Ochaya received his first call-up to the Ugandan national team in September 2012, making his debut later that year. He has appeared in FIFA World Cup qualifying matches. He was a squad member at the 2016 African Nations Championship.

Career statistics

International

International goals
Scores and results list Uganda's goal tally first.

References

1993 births
Living people
Sportspeople from Kampala
Ugandan footballers
Uganda international footballers
Association football fullbacks
Kampala Capital City Authority FC players
Navibank Sài Gòn FC players
Asante Kotoko S.C. players
Lusaka Dynamos F.C. players
TP Mazembe players
Al Mokawloon Al Arab SC players
Ugandan expatriate footballers
Ugandan expatriate sportspeople in Vietnam
Ugandan expatriate sportspeople in Ghana
Ugandan expatriate sportspeople in Zambia
Ugandan expatriate sportspeople in the Democratic Republic of the Congo
Ugandan expatriate sportspeople in Egypt
Expatriate footballers in Vietnam
Expatriate footballers in Ghana
Expatriate footballers in Zambia
Expatriate footballers in the Democratic Republic of the Congo
Expatriate footballers in Egypt
2017 Africa Cup of Nations players
2019 Africa Cup of Nations players
Uganda A' international footballers
2016 African Nations Championship players
Uganda Premier League players
V.League 1 players
Ghana Premier League players
Zambia Super League players
Linafoot players
Egyptian Premier League players